Funtovo-2 is a rural locality (a selo) and the administrative center of Funtovsky Selsoviet, Privolzhsky District, Astrakhan Oblast, Russia. The population was 430 as of 2010. There are 11 streets.

Geography 
Funtovo-2 is located 24 km southwest of Nachalovo (the district's administrative centre) by road. Funtovo-1 is the nearest rural locality.

References 

Rural localities in Privolzhsky District, Astrakhan Oblast